Morich is located in Rech district of Chitral District, Pakistan. 

Populated places in Chitral District